John "Jack" Hughes (1855 – 2 October 1914) was a Welsh amateur footballer who made two appearances as a forward for Wales in 1877 and 1879. He was also involved in the early days of Aberystwyth Town Football Club.

Early life and education
Hughes was born at Glynpadarn, near Aberystwyth, the son of Hugh Hughes, a local solicitor. He was educated at Shrewsbury School where he played "soccer" for the school first eleven in 1872–73.

In October 1874, he was admitted to Jesus College, Cambridge as a "pensioner", graduating with a Bachelor of Arts (B.A.) degree in 1878. At Cambridge, he was awarded a blue in 1875, 1876 and 1877; in the latter year, he played alongside fellow future Wales international, John Morgan.

Football career
As early as 1873, Hughes and his brother, Hugh, are recorded as scoring three goals between them in a football match in Aberystwyth.

Jack Hughes was captain of the local side until he moved away in 1879. Hughes was described as the "first exponent of the association game" in Aberystwyth and it was later said of him:The pre-eminence of Jack Hughes cannot be over-emphasized . . . he was one of the best forwards in the United Kingdom. At that period, combination was unknown and a single good player in a team counted a lot, so that Aberystwyth in virtue alone of their possession of a footballer of so much renown held a high place in the football world.

Hughes's international debut came in the first international played in Wales, against  Scotland on 5 March 1877. (The two countries had met the year before in Glasgow in Wales's first international match.) The match at Wrexham's Racecourse Ground ended in a 2–0 victory for the Scots. Hughes (now registered as an "Aberystwyth" player) was selected again two years later in April 1879, against the Scots; this match also ended in a Scottish victory, by a three-goal margin.

Later career
In 1879, Hughes left Aberystwyth and moved to London where he became a solicitor. He died in Bloomsbury in October 1914.

References

External links

1855 births
Footballers from Aberystwyth
1914 deaths
Alumni of Jesus College, Cambridge
Welsh footballers
Wales international footballers
Cambridge University A.F.C. players
Aberystwyth Town F.C. players
Association football forwards
Welsh solicitors